Wilwyn (foaled 1948 in England) was a Thoroughbred racehorse and sire.

Background
Wilwyn was sired by Pink Flower, a son of one of Germany's great runners, Oleander, a three-time winner of the Grosser Preis von Baden and a two-time winner of the Grosser Preis von Berlin. His dam, Saracen, was a daughter of Federico Tesio's outstanding  Italian runner, Donatello.

The horse was by Robert C. Boucher, a fruit farmer from Kent , and trained by George Colling.

Racing career
He raced at age three with his best conditions race result a third in the Knights Royal Stakes.

In October 1952, assistant trainer John Waugh brought the four-year-old Wilwyn to the United States where he won his eleventh straight race by capturing the inaugural running of the Washington, D.C. International Stakes at the Laurel Park Racecourse in Laurel, Maryland.  An outstanding race in which the lead changed hands six times, the success of the Washington, D.C. International Stakes would help spawn the Breeders' Cup.

The November 27, 1952 edition of the New York Times reported that an American syndicate was negotiating with owner Robert Boucher to buy Wilwyn. Boucher rejected an offer of US$100,000 and the deal did not go through.   

After winning the October 27, 1953 Limekiln Stakes at Newmarket Racecourse, Wilwyn was  sent back to the United States for the second edition of the Washington, D.C. International Stakes. This time, he finished out of the money.

Stud record
Wilwyn was retired to stud duty in England, but met with his greatest success as a sire after being sent to breeders in South Africa in 1959. There, he earned Leading sire honors in 1964.

References
 Photos of Wilwyn and the 1952 Washington D.C. International Stakes
 LIFE magazine story with photos on the 1952 Washington D.C. International Stakes

1948 racehorse births
Racehorses bred in the United Kingdom
Racehorses trained in the United Kingdom
South African Champion Thoroughbred Sires
Thoroughbred family 7-b